The Fort Atkinson Bridge is a historic structure located in Fort Atkinson, Iowa, United States. Pratt through truss bridges like its one were used almost exclusively in Iowa for medium spans from the early 1880s to 1913, when state bridge standards were enacted. This bridge was fabricated by the CRM Company, and constructed by D.H. Young of Manchester, Iowa. The 7-panel, pin-connected Pratt through truss is supported by a substructure of timber and concrete. It was listed on the National Register of Historic Places in 1998.

References

Bridges completed in 1892
Bridges in Winneshiek County, Iowa
National Register of Historic Places in Winneshiek County, Iowa
Road bridges on the National Register of Historic Places in Iowa
1892 establishments in Iowa
Pratt truss bridges in the United States